Labeobarbus boulengeri is a species of ray-finned fish in the  family Cyprinidae. It is found in the Luculla River system and the lower Congo River in Africa.

References

boulengeri
Fish described in 2016